Pei Songzhi (372–451), courtesy name Shiqi, was a Chinese historian and politician who lived in the late Eastern Jin dynasty and the Liu Song dynasty. His ancestral home was in Wenxi County, Shanxi, but he moved to the Jiangnan region later. He is best known for making annotations to the historical text Records of the Three Kingdoms (Sanguozhi) written by Chen Shou in the third century, providing additional details omitted from the original work. His commentary, completed in 429, became integral to later editions of the Sanguozhi, making the joint work three times as long as the original. His son, Pei Yin (裴駰), and great-grandson Pei Ziye (裴子野), were also well-known historians.

Life
Pei was born in a family of officials who served in the Eastern Jin government. His grandfather, Pei Mei (裴昧), served as a Household Counsellor (光祿大夫) while his father, Pei Gui (裴珪), was a zheng yuanwailang (正員外郎). Pei was fond of reading since his childhood, and he was already very familiar with classic texts such as the Analects of Confucius and the Classic of Poetry at the age of eight.

In 391, during the reign of Emperor Xiaowu, Pei became a Palace General (殿中將軍) at the age of 20. In 398, during the reign of Emperor An, Pei's maternal uncle, Yu Kai (庾楷), who was the Governor of Yu Province, allied with Wang Gong (王恭), the Governor of Yan and Qing provinces, to attack the imperial capital, Jiankang. They were defeated. Yu Kai fled to join the warlord Huan Xuan, after which he nominated Pei to be the Administrator of Xinye, but Pei considered the dangers of joining his uncle and refused to move there. War broke out between the warlords later and Yu Kai was killed by Huan Xuan. Pei survived because he did not join Yu Kai.

In the early fifth century, Pei served as a Regular Mounted Attendant (散騎侍郎) and later as the prefect (縣令) of Guzhang County. He was recalled to the imperial court later and was promoted to shangshu ci bu lang (尚書祠部郎; a ceremonial official). In 416, the Jin imperial court ordered Liu Yu, the Duke of Song, to lead a campaign against the state of Later Qin. Pei was serving as a registrar (主簿) then when he was ordered to join Liu Yu's army. Liu Yu was very impressed with Pei and praised him as a talented person, and then appointed him as zhizhong congshi shi (治中從事史). After Liu Yu's forces occupied Luoyang, Liu Yu appointed Pei as a xianma (洗馬) to assist the heir apparent of his dukedom.

Liu Yu usurped the throne in 420 and ended the Eastern Jin dynasty. He founded the Liu Song dynasty and became historically known as "Emperor Wu of Liu Song". Pei took up various appointments in the Liu Song government, including Secretary of the Interior (內史) of Lingling, State Academician (國子博士) and rongcong puye (冗從僕射). In 426, Emperor Wu's successor, Emperor Wen, sent officials to inspect the various provinces. Pei was sent to inspect Xiangzhou (湘州). After returning from his trip, Pei drafted 24 clauses based on his observations. He was promoted to Palace Gentleman Writer (中書侍郎) and Grand Judge (大中正) of Si and Ji provinces, and was enfeoffed as the Marquis of Xi District (西鄉侯).

In his later years, Pei served as the Administrator of Yongjia (永嘉太守), tongzhi sanqi changshi (通直散騎常侍), and Administrator of South Langya (南琅邪太守). Pei retired from service at the age of 65 in 437. However, not long later, he was recalled back to the imperial court, and he served as Attendant Counsellor (中散大夫), State Academician (國子博士), and Palace Counsellor (太中大夫). He died of illness at the age of 80 (by East Asian reckoning) in 451.

Works
Emperor Wen of the Liu Song dynasty felt that the historical text Records of the Three Kingdoms (Sanguozhi), written by Chen Shou in the third century, was too brief, so he commissioned Pei to make annotations to the text. Pei collected various sources, including those previously rejected by Chen Shou, and added them to the Sanguozhi, while making annotations and adding his personal commentary as well. His commentary, completed in 429, became integral to later editions of the Sanguozhi, making the joint work three times as long as the original. Emperor Wen praised his work as "immortal".

Apart from making annotations to the Sanguozhi, Pei also wrote other books such as the Jin Ji (晉紀; History of Jin), Pei Shi Jiazhuan (裴氏家傳; Pei Family Biographies), and Ji Zhu Sang Fu Jing Zhuan (集注喪服經傳).

Ancestors and descendants
Pei Songzhi is a member of the Pei clan of Hedong (河东裴氏). His son is Pei Yin, father of Pei Zhaoming (裴昭明; 460 - 502), father of Pei Ziye. Through his mother, Pei Songzhi is a great-grandson of the powerful Jin regent Yu Liang.

Pei Songzhi's father is Pei Gui (裴圭), son of Pei Mei (裴昧). Pei Mei's great-grandfather is Pei Kang (裴康). Pei Kang, along with his older brother Pei Li (裴黎), and younger brothers Pei Kai (裴楷) and Pei Chuo (裴绰) were famous during their time and were known as the "4 Peis".

References

Citations

Sources 

 Books
 Shen Yue. Book of Song, Volume 64, Biography of Pei Songzhi.

External links 
 
 

372 births
451 deaths
5th-century Chinese historians
Jin dynasty (266–420) people
Liu Song historians
Liu Song politicians
Pei clan of Hedong